Sir William Henry Arnold  (5 August 1903 - 21 July 1973) was Bailiff of Guernsey from 1960 to his death in 1973.

Early life
Arnold was born and educated on Guernsey. He was called to the English Bar in 1926 and the Guernsey Bar in 1927.

Bailiff
Arnold was Procureur (Attorney-General) from 1946 to 1960 and was then appointed Bailiff in 1960. In 1964 he led the successful move in Guernsey to abolish the death penalty for murder. In 1966 a civil servant, Basil Torode, raised Clameur de Haro in the Guernsey Parliament in front of Arnold, leading to uproar in the house.

He was active in the fundraising efforts for a new Arun-class lifeboat for the Saint Peter Port Lifeboat Station. He died before the new boat could be commissioned, and she was named the Sir William Arnold in his honour.

He was made CBE in the 1955 Queen's Birthday Honours List, knighted in the 1963 New Years Honours List and was made KBE in the 1973 Queen's Birthday Honours.

Personal life
Arnold died in office, just before his 70th birthday. The National Portrait Gallery holds a photograph of Arnold by Walter Bird.

References

Guernsey people
1903 births
1973 deaths
Bailiffs of Guernsey
Knights Bachelor
Knights Commander of the Order of the British Empire
Politicians awarded knighthoods